The 2021 Arizona State Sun Devils baseball team represents Arizona State University during the 2021 NCAA Division I baseball season. Arizona State is competing in the Pacific-12 Conference (Pac-12). The Sun Devils play their home games at Phoenix Municipal Stadium. Coach Tracy Smith is leading Arizona State in his 7th season with the program.

Previous season

The Sun Devils finished 13–4 overall, and 0–0 in the conference. The season was prematurely cut short due to the COVID-19 pandemic.

Personnel

Roster

Coaching Staff

Schedule and results

Rankings

2021 MLB draft

References

Arizona State Sun Devils baseball seasons
Arizona State Sun Devils
Arizona State Sun Devils baseball